Bii (born July 7, 1989) is a Taiwanese singer, songwriter, and actor.

Early life
Bii was born and raised in South Korea. His father is Taiwanese and his mother is Korean. At the time of his birth, the South Korean nationality law did not allow South Korean women who were married to foreigners to transmit their nationality to their children, so he was regarded as overseas Chinese in South Korea. He also has a younger brother, Pil Seo-yeong.

His life in South Korea was reported to be a bit challenging as he did not qualify for a national identity card. He could not afford any health insurance and he had to pay higher tuition fees than his Korean peers.

At the age of 17, SM talent agent scouted Bii, who was a high school student then, but his mother rejected the idea of him being a singer.

His native language is Korean. He did not learn Standard Mandarin until he came to Taiwan.

Nationality
In 2011, Bii acquired his nationality in Taiwan. He took a hiatus from the entertainment industry to serve his mandatory military service in Taiwan between November 2011 and November 2012.

Career

Audition
Bii was always interested in music. He was the lead singer in his high school band. Later he went to Dongguan, Mainland China to find his father, who worked there, to find a job. Afterwards, a friend of his father's took him to Taiwan and introduced him to the boss of Eagle Music, where Bii started to pursue a musical career.

Debut
On July 9, 2010, Bii released his first EP which was titled "Bii." This EP contains a total of 4 songs: 1 in Korean and the remaining 3 in Mandarin. On October 6, 2010, Bii released his first album, "Bii Story" which has been sung in both Korean and Mandarin.

Stage name
The name "Bii" stands for "Be-I-I," indicating his dual personas.

Music
As a singer and songwriter, he has composed a lot of songs or written the lyrics in Korean and Mandarin. Many of Bii's songs were the theme songs of TV series.
 His songs have been featured in many TV series, such as Zhong Wu Yan (2010), Love Around, Someone Like You, Bromance, Prince of Wolf, and Better Man in Taiwan.

Acting
Bii made a cameo appearance in the TV series Love Around (2013) as Peter. He appeared in Episode 1 of the TV series Someone Like You (2015) as Gu Long, who raced against Fang Zan Cheng played by Kingone Wang. He appeared as Wei Qingyang in a romance comedy, Bromance (2015), co-starring with Baron Chen, Megan Lai, Sean Lee, and Katie Chen.

Discography

EP

Album

Soundtrack

Filmography

Television

Film
 2016 Trolls, Branch (character voice in Taiwan's Mandarin version)
 2018 About Youth (有一种喜欢), 饰演崔修男

Awards and nominations

References

External links

 
 
 Bii Weibo

 Bii YouTube page
 Bii official website

1989 births
Living people
People from Seongnam
21st-century Taiwanese male singers
Taiwanese Mandopop singers
Taiwanese male television actors
Taiwanese people of Korean descent
Taiwanese expatriates in South Korea
English-language singers from Taiwan
Korean-language singers of Taiwan
21st-century Taiwanese male actors